Keith Richards (born 18 December 1943), often referred to during the 1960s and 1970s as "Keith Richard", is an English musician and songwriter who has achieved international fame as the co-founder, guitarist, secondary vocalist, and co-principal songwriter of the Rolling Stones. His songwriting partnership with Mick Jagger is one of the most successful in history. His career spans over six decades, and his guitar playing style has been a trademark of the Rolling Stones throughout the band's career. Richards gained press notoriety for his romantic involvements and illicit drug use, and he was often portrayed as a countercultural figure.

Richards was born in and grew up in Dartford, Kent. He studied at the Dartford Technical School and Sidcup Art College. After graduating, Richards befriended Jagger, Bill Wyman, Charlie Watts, and Brian Jones and joined the Rolling Stones. As a member of the Rolling Stones, Richards also sings lead on some Stones songs. Richards typically sings lead on at least one song a concert, including "Happy", "Before They Make Me Run", and "Connection". Outside of his career with the Rolling Stones, Richards has also played with his own side-project, The X-Pensive Winos. He also appeared in three Pirates of the Caribbean films as Captain Teague, father of Jack Sparrow, whose look and characterisation was inspired by Richards himself.

In 1989, Richards was inducted into the Rock and Roll Hall of Fame and in 2004 into the UK Music Hall of Fame with the Rolling Stones. Rolling Stone magazine ranked him fourth on its list of 100 best guitarists in 2011. The magazine lists fourteen songs that Richards wrote with the Rolling Stones' lead vocalist Jagger on its "500 Greatest Songs of All Time" list.

Early life
Richards was born on 18 December 1943 at Livingston Hospital, in Dartford, Kent, England. He is the only child of Doris Maud Lydia (née Dupree) and Herbert William Richards. His father was a factory worker who was wounded in the Second World War during the Normandy invasion. Richards's paternal grandparents, Ernie and Eliza Richards, were socialists and civic leaders, whom he credited as "more or less creat[ing] the Walthamstow Labour Party", and both were mayors of the Municipal Borough of Walthamstow in Essex, with Eliza becoming mayor in 1941. His great-grandfather's family originated from Wales.

His maternal grandfather, Augustus Theodore "Gus" Dupree, who toured Britain with a jazz big band, Gus Dupree and His Boys, fostered Richards's interest in the guitar. Richards has said that it was Dupree who gave him his first guitar. His grandfather 'teased' the young Richards with a guitar that was on a shelf that Richards couldn't reach at the time. Finally, Dupree told Richards that if Richards could reach the guitar, he could have it. Richards then devised all manner of ways of reaching the guitar, including putting books and cushions on a chair, until finally getting hold of the instrument, after which his grandfather taught him the rudiments of Richards's first tune, "Malagueña". He worked on the number 'like mad', and then his grandfather let him keep the guitar, which he called 'the prize of the century'. Richards played at home, listening to recordings by Billie Holiday, Louis Armstrong, Duke Ellington, and others. His father, on the other hand, disparaged his son's musical enthusiasm. One of Richards's first guitar heroes was Elvis's guitarist Scotty Moore.

Richards attended Wentworth Primary School with Mick Jagger and was his neighbour until 1954 when the Richards and Jagger families both moved. From 1955 to 1959, Richards attended Dartford Technical High School for Boys. He never sat the eleven-plus due to illness. Recruited by Dartford Tech's choirmaster, R. W. "Jake" Clare, he sang in a trio of boy sopranos at, among other occasions, Westminster Abbey for Queen Elizabeth II. In 1959, Richards was expelled from Dartford Tech for truancy and transferred to Sidcup Art College, where he met Dick Taylor. At Sidcup, he was diverted from his studies proper and devoted more time to playing guitar with other students in the boys' room. At this point, Richards had learned most of Chuck Berry's solos.

Richards met Jagger again by chance on a train platform when Jagger was heading for classes at the London School of Economics. The mail-order rhythm & blues albums from Chess Records by Chuck Berry and Muddy Waters that Jagger was carrying revealed a mutual interest and led to a renewal of their friendship. Along with mutual friend Dick Taylor, Jagger was singing in an amateur band, Little Boy Blue and the Blue Boys, which Richards soon joined. The Blue Boys folded when Brian Jones, after sharing thoughts on their joint interest in the blues music, invited Mick and Keith to the Bricklayers Arms pub, where they then met Ian Stewart.

By mid-1962 Richards had left Sidcup Art College to devote himself to music, and moved into a London flat with Jagger and Jones. His parents divorced at about the same time, resulting in his staying close to his mother and remaining estranged from his father until 1982.

After the Rolling Stones signed to Decca Records in 1963, the band's manager, Andrew Loog Oldham, dropped the s from Richards's surname, believing that Keith Richard, in his words, "looked more pop". During the late 1970s, Richards re-established the s in his surname.

Musicianship
Richards plays both lead and rhythm guitar parts, often in the same song; the Stones are generally known for their guitar interplay of rhythm and lead ("weaving") between him and the other guitarist in the band – Brian Jones (1962–1969), Mick Taylor (1969–1975), or Ronnie Wood (1975–present). In the recording studio Richards sometimes plays all of the guitar parts, notably on the songs "Paint It Black", "Ruby Tuesday", "Sympathy for the Devil", and "Gimme Shelter". He is also a vocalist, singing backing vocals on many Rolling Stones songs as well as occasional lead vocals, such as on the Rolling Stones' 1972 single "Happy", as well as with his side project, the X-Pensive Winos.

Bandleader
Since the departure of Brian Jones, Richards and Mick Jagger have shared primary songwriting and production duties (credited as the Glimmer Twins) for the Stones. Former keyboardist Ian Stewart once said that Richards was the Rolling Stones' bandleader; however, Richards has said that his job is merely "oiling the machinery". Unlike many bands where the drummer sets the pace and acts as a timesetter for a song, Richards fills that role for the Rolling Stones. Both former bassist Bill Wyman and current guitarist Ronnie Wood have said that the Stones did not follow the band's long-time drummer, Charlie Watts, but rather follow Richards, as there was "no way of 'not' following" him.

Guitarist

Chris Spedding calls Richards's guitar playing "direct, incisive and unpretentious". Richards says he focuses on chords and rhythms, avoiding flamboyant and competitive virtuosity and trying not to be the "fastest gun in the west". Richards prefers teaming with at least one other guitarist and has almost never toured without one. Chuck Berry has been an inspiration for Richards, and, with Jagger, he introduced Berry's songs to the Rolling Stones' early repertoire. In the late 1960s Brian Jones's declining contributions led Richards to record all guitar parts on many tracks, including slide guitar. Jones's replacement, Mick Taylor, played guitar with the Rolling Stones from 1969 to 1974. Taylor's virtuosity on lead guitar led to a pronounced separation between lead and rhythm guitar roles, most notably onstage. In 1975 Taylor was replaced by Wood, whose arrival marked a return to a guitar interplay Richards called "the ancient art of weaving", which he and Jones had gleaned from Chicago blues.

A break in touring during 1967–1968 allowed Richards to experiment with open tunings. He primarily used open tunings for fingered chording, developing a distinctive style of syncopated and ringing I–IV chording heard on "Street Fighting Man" and "Start Me Up". Richards's favouredbut not exclusively usedopen tuning is a five-string open G tuning: GDGBD. Richards often removes the lowest string from his guitar, playing with only five strings, as the lower string just "gets in the way" of Richards's playing, letting the band's bass player pick up those notes. Several of his Telecasters are tuned this way. This tuning is prominent on Rolling Stones recordings, including "Honky Tonk Women", "Brown Sugar", and "Start Me Up". Richards has stated that banjo tuning was the inspiration for this tuning.

Richards regards acoustic guitar as the basis for his playing, believing that the limitations of electric guitar would cause him to "lose that touch" if he stopped playing an acoustic. Richards plays acoustic guitar on many Rolling Stones tracks, including "Play with Fire", "Brown Sugar", and "Angie". All guitars on the studio versions of "Street Fighting Man" and "Jumpin' Jack Flash" feature acoustic guitars overloaded to a cassette recorder, then re-amped through a loudspeaker in the studio.

Vocals
Richards sang in a school choirmost notably for Queen Elizabeth IIuntil adolescence's effect on his voice forced him out of it. He has sung backing vocals on every Rolling Stones album. Since Between the Buttons (1967), he has sung lead or co-lead on at least one track (see list below) of every Rolling Stones studio album except Their Satanic Majesties Request, Sticky Fingers, It's Only Rock 'n Roll, and Blue & Lonesome.

Richards is the only band member of the Stones, aside from Jagger, to ever share or have a lead vocal role in concert and on official releases. He has sung lead on more than ten Rolling Stones songs, including "Happy", "You Got the Silver", and "Connection". During the Rolling Stones' 1972 tour, the Richards-sung "Happy" entered into their concert repertoire, and since then he has sung lead vocals on one or two songs each concert in order to give Jagger time to change his outfit. Keith usually starts with Max Miller routines such as "It's nice to be hereit's nice to be anywhere", in order to give the audience a moment to catch its proverbial breath. During the 2006 and 2007 Rolling Stones' tours, Richards sang "You Got the Silver" (1969) without playing any instrument.

Songwriting

Richards and Jagger began their songwriting partnership in 1963 at the insistence of manager Andrew Loog Oldham, who saw no long career for them in playing cover songs. The earliest Jagger/Richards collaborations were recorded by other artists, including Gene Pitney, whose rendition of "That Girl Belongs to Yesterday" was their first top ten single in the UK. They scored another top ten hit in 1964 with the debut single written for Marianne Faithfull, "As Tears Go By".

The first top-ten hit for the Rolling Stones with a Jagger and Richards original was "The Last Time" in early 1965; "(I Can't Get No) Satisfaction" (also 1965) was their first international number one recording. Richards has stated that the "Satisfaction" riff came to him in his sleep; he woke up just long enough to record it on a cassette player by his bed. Since Aftermath (1966) most Rolling Stones albums have consisted mainly of Jagger and Richards originals. Their songs reflect the influence of blues, R&B, rock & roll, pop, soul, gospel, and country, as well as forays into psychedelia and Dylanesque social commentary. Their work in the 1970s and beyond has incorporated elements of funk, disco, reggae, and punk. Richards has also written and recorded slow torchy ballads, such as "You Got the Silver" (1969), "Coming Down Again" (1973), "All About You" (1980) and "Slipping Away" (1989). His songwriting partnership with Mick Jagger is one of the most successful in history.

In his solo career, Richards has often shared co-writing credits with drummer and co-producer, Steve Jordan. Richards has stated, "I've always thought songs written by two people are better than those written by one. You get another angle on it."

Richards has frequently expressed that he feels less like a creator than a conduit when writing songs: "I don't have that God aspect about it. I prefer to think of myself as an antenna. There's only one song, and Adam and Eve wrote it; the rest is a variation on a theme." Richards was inducted into the Songwriters Hall of Fame in 1993.

Record production
Richards has been active as a music producer since the 1960s. He was credited as producer and musical director on the 1966 album Today's Pop Symphony, one of manager Andrew Loog Oldham's side projects, although there are doubts about how much Richards was actually involved with it. On the Rolling Stones' 1967 album Their Satanic Majesties Request, the entire band was credited as producer, but since 1974, Richards and Mick Jagger have frequently co-produced both Rolling Stones records and those by other artists under the name "the Glimmer Twins", often in collaboration with other producers.

In early 1973, Jagger and Richards developed an interest in the band Kracker, resulting in a deal whereby the band's second album was licensed for distribution outside America by Rolling Stones Records, making Kracker the first band on that label.

Since the 1980s Richards has chalked up numerous production and co-production credits on projects with other artists including Aretha Franklin, Johnnie Johnson, and Ronnie Spector, as well as on his own albums with the X-Pensive Winos (see below). In the 1990s Richards co-produced and added guitar and vocals to a recording of nyabinghi Rastafarian chanting and drumming entitled "Wingless Angels", released on Richards's own record label, Mindless Records, in 1997.

Solo recordings
Richards has released few solo recordings. His first solo single, released in 1978, was a cover of Chuck Berry's "Run Rudolph Run", backed with his version of Jimmy Cliff's "The Harder They Come". In 1987, after Jagger pursued a solo recording and touring career, Richards formed the "X-Pensive Winos" with co-songwriter and co-producer Steve Jordan, whom Richards assembled for his Chuck Berry documentary Hail! Hail! Rock 'n' Roll.

Additional members of the X-Pensive Winos included guitarist Waddy Wachtel, saxophonist Bobby Keys, keyboardist Ivan Neville, and Charley Drayton on bass. The first Winos' record, Talk Is Cheap, also featured Bernie Worrell, Bootsy Collins, and Maceo Parker. Since its release, Talk Is Cheap has gone gold and has sold consistently. Its release was followed by the first of the two US tours Richards has done as a solo artist. Live at the Hollywood Palladium, 15 December 1988 documents the first of these tours. In 1992 the Winos' second studio record, Main Offender, was released, also followed by a tour. Although the Winos featured on both albums, the albums were credited to Richards as a solo artist.

A third Richards album, Crosseyed Heart, was released in September 2015.

Recordings with other artists
During the 1960s most of Richards's recordings with artists other than the Rolling Stones were sessions for Andrew Loog Oldham's Immediate Records label. Notable exceptions were when Richards, along with Mick Jagger and numerous other guests, sang on the Beatles' 1967 TV broadcast of "All You Need Is Love", and when he played bass with John Lennon, Eric Clapton, Mitch Mitchell, Ivry Gitlis, and Yoko Ono as the Dirty Mac for The Rolling Stones Rock and Roll Circus TV special filmed in 1968.

In the 1970s Richards worked outside the Rolling Stones with Ronnie Wood on several occasions, contributing guitar, piano, and vocals to Wood's first two solo albums and joining him on stage for two July 1974 concerts to promote I've Got My Own Album to Do. In December 1974 Richards also made a guest appearance at a Faces concert. During 1976 and 1977, Richards both co-produced and played on John Phillips's solo recording Pay Pack & Follow (released in 2001). In 1979 he toured the US with the New Barbarians, the band that Wood put together to promote his album Gimme Some Neck; he and Wood also contributed guitar and backing vocals to "Truly" on Ian McLagan's 1979 album Troublemaker (re-released in 2005 as Here Comes Trouble).

Since the 1980s Richards has made more frequent guest appearances. In 1981 he played on reggae singer Max Romeo's album Holding Out My Love to You. He has worked with Tom Waits on three occasions: adding guitar and backing vocals to Waits's album Rain Dogs (1985); co-writing, playing on, and sharing the lead vocal on "That Feel" on Bone Machine (1992); and adding guitar and vocals to Bad As Me (2011). In 1986 Richards produced and played on Aretha Franklin's rendition of "Jumpin' Jack Flash" and served as musical producer and band leader (or, as he phrased it, "S&M director") for the Chuck Berry film Hail! Hail! Rock 'n' Roll.

In the 1990s and 2000s Richards continued to contribute to a wide range of musical projects as a guest artist. A few of the notable sessions he has done include guitar and vocals on Johnnie Johnson's 1991 release Johnnie B. Bad, which he also co-produced; and lead vocals and guitar on "Oh Lord, Don't Let Them Drop That Atomic Bomb on Me" on the 1992 Charles Mingus tribute album Weird Nightmare. He duetted with country legend George Jones on "Say It's Not You" on the Bradley Barn Sessions (1994); a second duet from the same sessions, "Burn Your Playhouse Down", appeared on Jones's 2008 release Burn Your Playhouse Down – The Unreleased Duets. He partnered with Levon Helm on "Deuce and a Quarter" for Scotty Moore's album All the King's Men (1997). His guitar and lead vocals are featured on the Hank Williams tribute album Timeless (2001) and on veteran blues guitarist Hubert Sumlin's album About Them Shoes (2005). Richards also added guitar and vocals to Toots & the Maytals' recording of "Careless Ethiopians" for their 2004 album True Love, which won the Grammy Award for Best Reggae Album. Additionally, in December 2007 Richards released a download-only Christmas single via iTunes of "Run Rudolph Run"; and the B-side was a 2003 recorded version of the famous reggae song "Pressure Drop" featuring Toots Hibbert singing with Richards backed by original Maytals band members Jackie Jackson and Paul Douglas.

Rare and unreleased recordings
In 2005 the Rolling Stones released Rarities 1971–2003, which includes some rare and limited-issue recordings, but Richards has described the band's released output as the "tip of the iceberg". Many of the band's unreleased songs and studio jam sessions are widely bootlegged, as are numerous Richards solo recordings, including his 1977 Toronto studio sessions, some 1981 studio sessions, and tapes made during his 1983 wedding trip to Mexico.

Public image and personal life

Relationships and family
Richards was romantically involved with Italian-born actress Anita Pallenberg (d. 13 June 2017), from 1967 to 1979, after which they remained cordial. Together they have a son, Marlon Leon Sundeep (named after the actor Marlon Brando), born in 1969, and a daughter, Angela (originally named Dandelion), born in 1972. Their third child, a son named Tara Jo Jo Gunne—after Richards's and Pallenberg's friend, Guinness heir Tara Browne—died aged just over two months, of sudden infant death syndrome (SIDS), on 6 June 1976. Richards was away on tour at the time, something he said has haunted him since. He was criticised at the time for performing that night after learning of the death, but he later said it was the only way he could cope. Before they became romantically linked, Pallenberg had been involved with his fellow Rolling Stones bandmate and close friend Brian Jones. The two became a couple on a trip to Morocco that Jones had to abandon when he fell ill; the subsequent relationship between Richards and Pallenberg weighed heavily on Jones, and strained his relationship with the rest of the Rolling Stones.

Richards met his wife, model Patti Hansen, in 1979. They married on 18 December 1983, Richards's 40th birthday, and have two daughters, Theodora Dupree and Alexandra Nicole, born in 1985 and 1986, respectively. In September 2014 Richards published a children's book with Theodora, Gus and Me: The Story of My Granddad and My First Guitar. Theodora was reported as contributing pen and ink illustrations for the book, which was inspired by the man she was named after (Richards's grandfather Theodore Augustus Dupree).

He has five grandchildren, three from his son Marlon and two from his daughter Angela.

Friendship with Mick Jagger

Richards's relationship with bandmate Mick Jagger is frequently described as "love/hate" by the media. Richards himself said in a 1998 interview: "I think of our differences as a family squabble. If I shout and scream at him, it's because no one else has the guts to do it or else they're paid not to do it. At the same time I'd hope Mick realises that I'm a friend who is just trying to bring him into line and do what needs to be done." Richards, along with Johnny Depp, tried unsuccessfully to persuade Jagger to appear in Pirates of the Caribbean: On Stranger Tides, alongside Depp and Richards.

Richards's autobiography, Life, was published on 26 October 2010. Eleven days prior to its release, the Associated Press published an article stating that in the book Richards refers to Jagger as "unbearable" and notes that their relationship has been strained "for decades". His opinion softening by 2015, Richards still said Jagger could come off as a "snob" but added, "I still love him dearly... your friends don't have to be perfect."

Drug use and arrests
Music journalist Nick Kent attached to Richards Lord Byron's epithet of "mad, bad, and dangerous to know". Jagger thought that Richards's image had "contributed to him becoming a junkie". In 1994, Richards said his image was "like a long shadow ... Even though that was nearly twenty years ago, you cannot convince some people that I'm not a mad drug addict."

Richards's notoriety for illicit drug use stems in part from several drug busts during the late 1960s and 1970s and his candour about using heroin and other substances. Richards has been tried on drug-related charges five times: in 1967, twice in 1973, in 1977, and in 1978. The first trialthe only one culminating in a prison sentence – resulted from a February 1967 police raid on Redlands, Richards's Sussex estate, where he and some friends, including Jagger, were spending the weekend. The subsequent arrest of Richards and Jagger put them on trial before the British courts, whilst also trying them in the court of public opinion. On 29 June 1967, Jagger was sentenced to three months' imprisonment for possession of four amphetamine tablets. Richards was found guilty of allowing cannabis to be smoked on his property and sentenced to one year in prison. Both Jagger and Richards were imprisoned at that point: Jagger was taken to Brixton Prison in south London, and Richards to Wormwood Scrubs Prison in west London. Both were released on bail the next day pending appeal. On 1 July, The Times ran an editorial entitled "Who breaks a butterfly upon a wheel?", portraying Jagger's sentence as persecution, and public sentiment against the convictions increased. A month later the appeals court overturned Richards's conviction for lack of evidence, and gave Jagger a conditional discharge.

On 27 February 1977, while Richards was staying in a Toronto hotel, then known as the Harbour Castle Hilton on Queen's Quay East, the Royal Canadian Mounted Police found heroin in his room and charged him with "possession of heroin for the purpose of trafficking"an offence that at that time could result in prison sentences of seven years to life under the Narcotic Control Act. His passport was confiscated, and Richards and his family remained in Toronto until 1 April, when Richards was allowed to enter the United States on a medical visa for treatment of heroin addiction. The charge against him was later reduced to "simple possession of heroin".

For the next two years, Richards lived under threat of criminal sanction. Throughout this period he remained active with the Rolling Stones, recording their biggest-selling studio album, Some Girls, and touring North America. Richards was tried in October 1978, pleading guilty to possession of heroin. He was given a suspended sentence and put on probation for one year, with orders to continue treatment for heroin addiction and to perform a benefit concert on behalf of the Canadian National Institute for the Blind after a blind fan testified on his behalf. Although the prosecution had filed an appeal of the sentence, Richards performed two CNIB benefit concerts at Oshawa Civic Auditorium on 22 April 1979; both shows featured the Rolling Stones and the New Barbarians. In September 1979, the Ontario Court of Appeal upheld the original sentence.

In 2016, he stated that he still occasionally drinks alcohol and consumes hashish and cannabis.

Other details
Richards owns Redlands, a Sussex estate he purchased in 1966, as well as homes in Weston, Connecticut and in the private resort island of Parrot Cay, Turks & Caicos. His primary home is in Weston. In June 2013, Richards said that he would retire with his family to Parrot Cay or Jamaica if he knew his death was coming. However, in November 2016, he said, "I'd like to croak magnificently, onstage." Richards is an avid reader with a strong interest in history, and owns an extensive library. An April 2010 article revealed that Richards yearns to be a librarian.

Richards is a keen fan of shepherd's pie, a British traditional dish. Stuart Cable recollected that while drummer for the Stereophonics, he was confronted by Richards because he had served himself a piece of the shepherd's pie meant for Richards. The dish was also mentioned by Richards in his autobiography, advising readers to add more onions after cooking the meat filling to enhance the pie's flavour.

21st century
On 27 April 2006, while in Fiji, Richards slipped off the branch of a dead tree (erroneously reported by the international press as a coconut tree) and suffered a head injury. He subsequently underwent cranial surgery at a New Zealand hospital. The incident delayed the Rolling Stones' 2006 European tour for six weeks and forced the band to reschedule several shows. The revised tour schedule included a brief statement from Richards apologising for "falling off my perch". The band made up most of the postponed dates in 2006, and toured Europe in 2007 to make up the remainder. In a video message in late 2013 as part of the On Fire tour, Richards gave his thanks to the surgeons in New Zealand who treated him, remarking, "I left half my brain there."

In August 2006, Richards was granted a pardon by Arkansas governor Mike Huckabee for a 1975 reckless driving citation. Actor Johnny Depp has stated that his character in the movie franchise Pirates of the Caribbean is loosely based on Richards and the Warner Bros. cartoon character Pepe Le Pew, with both serving as the inspiration for the manner of the character. This combination of influences originally raised concerns with Disney corporate executives, who feared that Depp was "drunk and gay", with Michael Eisner fearing that he was "ruining the movie". In the third installment of the Pirates of the Caribbean series, At World's End, Richards played Captain Edward Teague, later reprising the role in Pirates of the Caribbean: On Stranger Tides, the fourth film in the series (2011).

In 2012, Richards joined the 11th annual Independent Music Awards judging panel to assist independent musicians' careers. In a 2015 interview with the New York Daily News, Richards expressed his dislike for rap and hip hop, deeming them for "tone deaf" people and consisting of "a drum beat and somebody yelling over it". In the same interview he called Metallica and Black Sabbath "great jokes" and bemoaned the lack of syncopation in most rock and roll, claiming it "sounds like a dull thud to me". He also said he stopped being a Beatles fan in 1967 when they visited the Maharishi Mahesh Yogi, but this did not prevent him from playing bass in John Lennon's pickup band The Dirty Mac for a performance of the Beatles' song "Yer Blues" in the Stones' Rock and Roll Circus in December 1968.

For the weekend of 23 September 2016, Richards, together with director Julien Temple, curated and hosted a three-night programme on BBC Four titled Lost Weekend. Richards's choices consisted of his favourite 1960s comedy shows, cartoons and thrillers, interspersed with interviews, rare musical performances and night imagery. This 'televisual journey' was the first of its kind on British TV. Temple also directed a documentary, The Origin of the Species, about Richards's childhood in post-war England and his musical roots.

Tributes for other artists

From the start of his career, Richards has made appearances to pay tribute to those artists with whom he has formed friendships and those who have inspired and encouraged him. After the earliest success of the band, who played cover songs of American blues artists, while he and Jagger were just beginning their own songwriting, the Rolling Stones visited the States to pay back, in his words, "that's where that fame bit comes in handy". Since that time, he has performed on many occasions to show appreciation toward them. Among these, he has appeared with Norah Jones in a tribute concert for Gram Parsons in 2006, playing guitar and singing a duet, "Love Hurts". On 12 March 2007 Richards attended the Rock & Roll Hall of Fame ceremony to induct the Ronettes; he also played guitar during the ceremony's all-star jam session. On 26 February 2012 Richards paid tribute to fellow musicians Chuck Berry and Leonard Cohen, who were the recipients of the first annual PEN Awards for songwriting excellence at the JFK Presidential Library in Boston, Massachusetts.

Richards is interviewed on screen and appears in performance footage in the 2005 documentary film Make It Funky!, which presents a history of New Orleans music and its influence on rhythm and blues, rock and roll, funk and jazz. In the film, Richards said that New Orleans musicians "put the roll into rock". He also performed the Fats Domino song "I'm Ready" with the house band.

In an April 2007 interview for NME magazine, music journalist Mark Beaumont asked Richards what the strangest thing he ever snorted was, and quoted him as replying: "My father. I snorted my father. He was cremated and I couldn't resist grinding him up with a little bit of blow. My dad wouldn't have cared ... It went down pretty well, and I'm still alive." In the media uproar that followed, Richards's manager said that the anecdote had been meant as a joke; Beaumont told Uncut magazine that the interview had been conducted by international telephone and that he had misquoted Richards at one point (reporting that Richards had said he listens to Motörhead, when what he had said was Mozart), but that he believed the ash-snorting anecdote was true. Musician Jay Farrar from the band Son Volt wrote a song titled 'Cocaine And Ashes', which was inspired by Richards's drug habits. The incident was also referenced in the 2017 song "Mr Charisma" by The Waterboys, featuring the lyrics: "Hey Mr Charisma, what will your next trick be? Slagging Sgt Pepper, snorting your old man's bones, or falling out of a tree?"

Doris Richards, his mother, died of cancer at the age of 91 in England on 21 April 2007. An official statement released by a family representative stated that Richards kept a vigil by her bedside during her last days.

Richards made a cameo appearance as Captain Teague, the father of Captain Jack Sparrow (played by Johnny Depp), in Pirates of the Caribbean: At World's End, released in May 2007, and won the Best Celebrity Cameo award at the 2007 Spike Horror Awards for the role.
Depp has stated that he based many of Sparrow's mannerisms on Richards. Richards reprised his role in Pirates of the Caribbean: On Stranger Tides, released in May 2011.

In March 2008, the fashion house Louis Vuitton unveiled an advertising campaign featuring a photo of Richards with his ebony Gibson ES-355, taken by photographer Annie Leibovitz. Richards donated the fee for his involvement to the Climate Project, an organisation for raising environmental awareness.

On 28 October 2008, Richards appeared at the Musicians' Hall of Fame induction ceremony in Nashville, Tennessee, joining the newly inducted the Crickets on stage for performances of "Peggy Sue", "Not Fade Away", and "That'll Be the Day".

In August 2009, Richards was ranked at No. 4 in Time magazine's list of the 10 best electric guitar players of all time. In September 2009 Richards told Rolling Stone magazine that in addition to anticipating a new Rolling Stones album, he had done some recording with Jack White: "I enjoy working with Jack", he said. "We've done a couple of tracks." On 17 October 2009 Richards received the Rock Immortal Award at Spike TV's Scream 2009 awards ceremony at the Greek Theatre, Los Angeles; the award was presented by Johnny Depp. "I liked the living legend, that was all right", Richards said, referring to an award he received in 1989, "but immortal is even better."

In 2009, a book of Richards's quotations was published, titled What Would Keith Richards Do?: Daily Affirmations from a Rock 'n' Roll Survivor.

In August 2007, Richards signed a publishing deal for his autobiography, Life, which was released on 26 October 2010.

Richards appeared in the 2011 documentary Toots and the Maytals: Reggae Got Soul, which was featured on BBC and described as "The untold story of one of the most influential artists ever to come out of Jamaica".

Honours 
In 2011, Rolling Stone magazine referred to Richards as the creator of "rock's greatest single body of riffs" on guitar, ranking him fourth on its list of the top 100 best guitarists. Rolling Stone also lists fourteen songs he co-wrote with Jagger on its "500 Greatest Songs of All Time" list.

Musical equipment

Guitars

Richards has a collection of approximately 3,000 guitars. Even though he has used many different guitar models, in a 1986 Guitar World interview Richards joked that no matter what model he plays, "[G]ive me five minutes and I'll make 'em all sound the same." Richards has often thanked Leo Fender, and other guitar manufacturers for making the instruments, as he did during the induction ceremony of the Rolling Stones into the Rock and Roll Hall of Fame.

Amplifiers
Richards's amplifier preferences have changed repeatedly, but he is a long-time proponent of using low-powered amps in the studio, getting clarity plus distortion by using two amps, a larger one such as a Fender Twin run clean, along with a Fender Champ, which is overdriven. To record "Crosseyed Heart", Richards used a stock tweed Fender Champ with 8" speaker coupled with a modified Fender Harvard.

Some of his notable amplifiers are:
Mesa/Boogie Mark 1 A804Used between 1977 and 1993, this 100-watt 1x12" combo is finished in hardwood with a wicker grille. It can be heard on the Rolling Stones albums Love You Live, Some Girls, Emotional Rescue, and Tattoo You, as well as on Richards's two solo albums, Talk is Cheap and Main Offender. This amplifier was handcrafted by Randall Smith and delivered to Richards in March 1977.
Fender TwinSince the 1990s, Richards has tended to use a variety of Fender "tweed" Twins on stage. Containing a pair of 12" speakers, the Fender Twin was, by 1958, an 80-watt all-tube guitar amplifier. Richards has utilised a pair of Fender Twins "to achieve his signature clean/dirty rhythm and lead sound."
Fender Dual ShowmanFirst acquired in 1964. Richards made frequent use of his blackface Dual Showman amp through mid-1966. Used to record The Rolling Stones, Now!, Out of Our Heads, December's Children, and Aftermath before switching over to various prototype amplifiers from Vox in 1967 and the fairly new Hiwatt in 1968.
Ampeg SVTWith 350 watts, the Ampeg SVT amp's midrange control, midrange shift switch, input pads, treble control with bright switch shaped the guitar sound of 1970s live Stones. Used live by the Stones for guitar, bass, and organ (Leslie) from 1969 to 1978. For a brief period in 1972 and 1973, Ampeg V4 and VT40 amps shared duties in the studio with Fender Twin and Deluxe Reverb amps.

Effects

In 1965, Richards used a Gibson Maestro fuzzbox to achieve the distinctive tone of his riff on "(I Can't Get No) Satisfaction"; the success of the resulting single boosted the sales of the device to the extent that all available stock had sold out by the end of 1965. In the 1970s and early 1980s Richards frequently used guitar effects such as a wah-wah pedal, a phaser, and a Leslie speaker, but he has mainly relied on combining "the right amp with the right guitar" to achieve the sound he wants.

Discography

 Talk Is Cheap (1988)
 Main Offender (1992)
 Crosseyed Heart (2015)

Filmography

Bibliography
 2010: Life
 2014: Gus & Me: The Story of My Granddad and My First Guitar

References

Citations

Works cited

External links

 
 
 
  in 2010
 
 
 
 CBC Archives Richards's trial and sentencing in 24 October 1978 and 16 April 1979
 

 
1943 births
20th-century English male singers
20th-century English singers
21st-century English male singers
21st-century English singers
British rhythm and blues boom musicians
English autobiographers
English blues guitarists
English male guitarists
English people of Welsh descent
English rock guitarists
English rock singers
English male singer-songwriters
English people convicted of drug offences
English record producers
Ivor Novello Award winners
Rhythm guitarists
Lead guitarists
Living people
Musicians from Kent
People from Dartford
Recipients of American gubernatorial pardons
The Dirty Mac members
The Rolling Stones members
Virgin Records artists
English expatriates in the United States
English male film actors
People from Weston, Connecticut